Alpinia nieuwenhuizii, also known as lalemas (in Iban) or terebak (in Sabah), is a species of flowering plant, a perennial tropical forest herb in the ginger family, that is endemic to Borneo.

Description
The species grows as a clump of leafy shoots to 2–3.5 m in height from branching rhizomes in the topsoil. The leaves grow from a pseudostem with a swollen base composed of the leaf sheaths. The inflorescence is a lax terminal panicle of white, red and cream flowers. The round, edible fruits are green or red when young, ripening yellow, containing small seeds in a whitish aril.

Distribution and habitat
The species is found in the lowland and mixed dipterocarp forest, as well as secondary forest, at elevations of up to 1,000 m, often along streams.

Usage
The species is rarely cultivated, with the fruits eaten mainly by hunter-gatherers. The shoots may be eaten as a vegetable.

References

 
nieuwenhuizii
Endemic flora of Borneo
Fruits originating in Asia
Plants described in 1904
Taxa named by Theodoric Valeton
Flora of the Borneo lowland rain forests